The 2007 Nova Scotia Liberal Party leadership election was held on April 27, 2007 at the Dartmouth Sportsplex, following the resignation of Francis MacKenzie, shortly after failing to win a seat in the 2006 election.  This was the third leadership convention for the Liberals since 2002. In addition to the leadership convention, the party will hold its Annual General Meeting including the election of officers, adoption of policies, and potential constitutional amendments. It was won by Annapolis MLA Stephen McNeil.

The party had held government for much of the province's history, having been in power from Canadian Confederation in 1867 to 1878, 1882 to 1925, 1933 to 1956, 1970 to 1978, and 1993 to 1999. However, the party had been relegated to third party status after it lost the 1999 election.

Timeline

2006
 June 20: Michel Samson is selected as interim leader.

2007
 January 10: Mike Smith, the mayor of Colchester County, becomes the first registered candidate, launching his campaign in Truro.
 January 12: Interim leader Michel Samson announces that he will not run for party leadership.
 January 18: Halifax-Clayton Park MLA Diana Whalen becomes the second and highest profile candidate in the race, launching her campaign in Halifax.
 January 19: Kenzie MacKinnon announces that he will enter the leadership race.
 January 30: Annapolis MLA Stephen McNeil becomes the second MLA to enter the race; he is the first to have endorsements from current MLAs.
 April 28: Stephen McNeil elected leader.

Rules
The new leader was chosen by a full delegated convention, the first in the party since 1986. The leader was elected using a one member, one vote system, which has been used since 1992. The party issued a 78 page document, outlining the rules, on January 15, 2007.

Candidates

 Kenzie MacKinnon, lawyer and three-time Liberal candidate 
 Stephen McNeil, MLA for Annapolis 
 Mike Smith, mayor of Colchester County
 Diana Whalen, MLA for Halifax-Clayton Park 

Various members of the party announced that they would not seek the leadership. Among them were interim leader Michel Samson, Dartmouth physician John Gillis, and Liberal MPs Geoff Regan, Scott Brison, and Michael Savage.

Endorsements
The following is a list of high-profile endorsers for each of the candidates; the list includes MLAs, MPs, and Senators, as well as former MLAs, Premiers, and Lieutenant-Governors.

MacKinnon (3)
 Mary Clancy, former MP for Halifax
 Allan J. MacEachen, former MP and Deputy Prime Minister
 Russell MacLellan, former Premier of Nova Scotia

McNeil (9)
 Jim Cowan, Senator
 Kirk Cox, former candidate, Shelburne
 Rodger Cuzner, Liberal MP for Cape Breton—Canso
 Don Downe, former MLA, Lunenburg West
 Wayne Gaudet, MLA for Clare
 Leo Glavine, MLA for Kings West
 Jim Smith, former MLA, Dartmouth East
 Harold Theriault, MLA for Digby-Annapolis
 Robert Thibault, Liberal MP for West Nova

Smith (13)
Aldric d'Entremont, Warden, Municipality of Argyle
Lloyd Hines, Warden, Municipality of the District of Guysborough
Glenn Horne, President, St. F.X. Young Liberals
Dennis James, former President NS Young Liberals, Chief of Staff to Premier John Savage, Former Federal Candidate
Ed Kinley, former MLA for Halifax Citadel
Ed Lorraine, former MLA and provincial Minister of Agriculture
Kennie MacAskill, former MLA and provincial Minister of Natural Resources
Richie Mann, President of Dartmouth Cole Harbour, former MLA, former Minister of Transportation, Tourism, and Economic Development
Duart McAuley, Warden, Municipality of the County of Inverness
Traci-Lyn McMenamon, VP Hants East Liberal Association
Eleanor Norrie, former MLA Truro-Bible Hill, former Minister of Natural Resources, Housing and Consumer Affairs, and Status of Women
Lorraine Sheppard, Cape Breton South, past member of the Nova Scotia Liberal Party Management Committee
Gordon Thompson, President, Yarmouth Liberal Association
Floyd Tucker, former MLA for Colchester North

Whalen (9)
 Alan Abraham, former Lieutenant Governor of Nova Scotia
 Wayne Adams, former Liberal MLA
 Carolyn Bennett, Liberal MP for Toronto riding of St. Paul's
 Bernie Boudreau, former MLA and Senator
 Scott Brison, Liberal MP for Kings—Hants
 Garnet Brown, former Liberal MLA
 Keith Colwell, MLA for Preston
 Jane Cordy, Senator
 Geoff Regan, Liberal MP for Halifax West
 Dave Wilson, MLA for Glace Bay

Caucus members who did not endorse a candidate
 Manning MacDonald, MLA for Cape Breton South
 Michel Samson, MLA for Richmond, was the interim leader and remained neutral in the leadership race.

Results

See also
 Leadership convention for more information about the selection of party leaders in Canada.

Notes

References

External links
Nova Scotia Liberal Party

Liberal
2007 elections in Canada
2007 in Nova Scotia
Nova Scotia Liberal Party leadership election